was a Rinzai Buddhist temple and royal bodaiji of the Ryūkyū Kingdom, located in Naha, Okinawa. 

The temple was erected by Keiin Ansen during the reign of King Shō Taikyū (r. 1454–1460). The Mahavira Hall was built in 1466, a bonshō was cast in 1469 and hung at it.

The temple was used as bodaiji of kings during the first Shō Dynasty. In the second Shō Dynasty, it was used as bodaiji of unmarried Ryukyuan princes and princesses. Ryukyuan king should visit Enkaku-ji, Tennō-ji and Tenkai-ji after his genpuku and investiture.

Ryukyu was annexed by Japan in 1879, and Tenkai-ji was closed in the same year. It was destroyed in the 1945 battle of Okinawa.

See also
Enkaku-ji (Okinawa)
Tennō-ji (Okinawa)
Sōgen-ji

References 

15th-century Buddhist temples
Buddhist temples in Okinawa Prefecture
1879 disestablishments